Hamid Parvar (born September 12, 1989) is an Iranian footballer who plays for Zob Ahan in the IPL.

Club career
Parvar has been with Zob Ahan since 2010.

References

External sources
 Profile at PersianLeague
 

1996 births
Living people
Zob Ahan Esfahan F.C. players
Iranian footballers
Association football defenders